Hey is a surname. Notable people with the surname include:
 Dale Hey (1947–2012), Canadian-born American professional wrestler better known as Buddy Roberts
 David Hey (1938–2016), English historian
 Donald Holroyde Hey (1904–1987), British organic chemist
 Jerry Hey (born 1950), American musician
 Jonathan Hey (born 1979), information scientist
 Tony Hey (born 1946), British computer scientist
 Vic Hey (1912–1995), Australian rugby league footballer
 Virginia Hey (born 1952), Australian actress
 William Hey (surgeon) (1736–1819), English surgeon